Udea tritalis is a moth in the family Crambidae. It was described by Hugo Theodor Christoph in 1881. It is found in the Russian Far East (Ussuri), Japan, Korea and northern China.

References

tritalis
Moths described in 1881